Shenguang Mountain is a hill located south of Xingning, China. The name comes from the Shenguang Temple there. ("Shenguang" in Chinese means halo, or a place of gods.)

See also
 http://www.mzboftec.gov.cn/shownews.asp?id=975

Xingning, Guangdong
Hills of China
Landforms of Guangdong